The Swabian League (Schwäbischer Bund) was a mutual defence and peace keeping association of Imperial Estates – free Imperial cities, prelates, principalities and knights – principally in the territory of the early medieval stem duchy of Swabia established on 14 February 1488.

The religious revolution of the Protestant Reformation divided its members, and the Swabian League disbanded in 1534.

History
The Swabian League was established in 1488 at the behest of Emperor Frederick III of Habsburg and supported as well by Bertold von Henneberg-Römhild, archbishop of Mainz, whose conciliar rather than monarchic view of the Reich often put him at odds with Frederick's successor Maximilian. The Swabian League cooperated towards the keeping of the imperial peace and at least in the beginning curbing the expansionist Bavarian dukes from the House of Wittelsbach and the revolutionary threat from the south in the form of the Swiss. The League held regular meetings, supported tribunals and maintained a unified force of 12,000 infantrymen and 1200 cavalry.

On 14 February 1488, a new Swabian League was formed, at the Reichstag of Esslingen, not only of 22 Imperial cities but also of the Swabian knights' League of St. George's Shield, bishops, and princes (Ansbach, Baden, Bavaria, Bayreuth, Hesse, Mainz, the Electorate of the Palatinate, Trier, Tyrol, and Württemberg). The league was governed by a federal council of three colleges of princes, cities, and knights calling upon an army of 13,000 men. It aided in the rescue of the future emperor Maximilian I, son of Emperor Frederick III, held prisoner in the Low Countries, and later was his main support in southern Germany.

After the death of Eberhard of Württemberg in 1496 the League produced no single outstanding generally accepted leader, and with the peace of 1499 with the Swiss and the definitive defeat of the aggressive Wittelsbachs in 1504, the League's original purpose, maintenance of the status quo in the southwest, was accomplished. Its last major action was the occupation and annexation of the Free City of Reutlingen by duke Ulrich of Württemberg in 1519  during the interregnum that followed the death of Maximilian I. The duke was overthrown, and his territory was sold to Charles V, offsetting the costs of the campaign.

The League defeated an alliance of robber barons in the Franconian War in 1523. Next it helped to suppress the Peasants' Revolt in 1524–26, including its defeat and execution of Little Jack (Jaecklein) Rohrbach, and crushing the Black Company in its last stand at the Battle of Ingolstadt in May 1525.

The religious revolution of the Protestant Reformation divided its members, and the Swabian League disbanded in 1534.

Members 
  Sigismund of Habsburg, Count of Tyrol and Archduke of Further Austria, followed by Archduke Maximilian I of Habsburg in 1490
  Eberhard V, Count of Württemberg (raised to a duke in 1495), succeeded by Duke Eberhard II in 1496
joined by several princes of the Empire until 1489:
  Frederick II of Hohenzollern, Prince-Bishop of Augsburg
  Christopher I, Margrave of Baden
  George Frederick of Hohenzollern, Margrave of Brandenburg-Ansbach
  Siegmund of Hohenzollern, Margrave of Brandenburg-Bayreuth
  Bertold von Henneberg-Römhild, Archbishop of Mainz and Prince-elector
  John II of Baden, Archbishop of Trier and Prince-elector
extended after 1500 by its former opponent:
  Albert IV of Wittelsbach, Duke of Bavaria-Munich, Duke of re-united Bavaria from 1503.
In 1512 Baden and Württemberg left the league, while the Prince-Bishops of Bamberg and Eichstätt were admitted, followed by
  Philip I, Landgrave of Hesse in 1519
  Louis V of Wittelsbach of the Electorate of the Palatinate, Prince-elector as well as
  Otto Henry and Philip of Wittelsbach, Counts Palatine of Palatinate-Neuburg and
  Conrad II von Thüngen, Prince-Bishop of Würzburg in 1523 and finally
  Matthäus Lang von Wellenburg, Prince-Archbishop of Salzburg in 1525.

Notes

Attribution

Further reading
 Close, Christopher W. "Estate Solidarity and Empire: Charles V's Failed Attempt to Revive the Swabian League." Archiv für Reformationsgeschichte (2013) 104#1 pp 134–157, in English.

 
History of Baden-Württemberg
Medieval Bavaria
16th century in Bavaria
History of Swabia
Military alliances involving the Holy Roman Empire
Warfare of the Middle Ages
1480s establishments in the Holy Roman Empire
1488 establishments in Europe
1530s disestablishments in the Holy Roman Empire
1534 disestablishments